Danner is an unincorporated community located in Malheur County, Oregon, United States. It lies along Danner Road off U.S. Route 95 west of Jordan Valley. Jordan Creek flows by Danner.

History
The old Idaho-Oregon-Nevada highway ran through Danner, following the route of the Skinner Toll Road which opened the area for settlement in 1863.

Danner is the location of Jean Baptiste Charbonneau's resting place. He was the youngest member of the Lewis and Clark Expedition as the infant son of Sacagawea.  Charbonneau died here in 1866 at the age of 61 after developing pneumonia while passing through the area. His burial site was located, marked and fenced off through the efforts of Danner residents Kirt and Johanna Skinner, and it was entered into the National Register of Historic Places on March 14, 1973. Charbonneau's resting place lies among five other resting places near the "Inskip Station", a fortified stone ranch house that operated as a stage station in the 1860s. Inskip's property was later known as the Ruby Ranch.  A plaque marks the remains of Inskip Station within sight of the resting place of Charbonneau.

A town had been platted and promoted as Ruby Townsite by Harley J. Hooker, who sold land for $1.25 per acre when the Jordan Valley Irrigation District began constructing an irrigation dam and canal system near Danner about 1910.  The proposed agricultural town never grew as anticipated, however, since the high desert's harsh climate did not allow farmers to produce a wide enough range of crops.  Hooker built a single story lava rock office building in Danner about 1915.  After his death in 1919 it was used as the Danner community hall for a number of years. It became unsafe and was demolished a few years ago.

The name of the community comes from John H. Danner, an early area settler. The Postal Service denied an application to call the post office Ruby for the nearby Ruby Ranch, but in 1920 the post office name Danner was approved. The post office operated until 1942.

By the 1930s, Danner had a general store run by Jesse Anderson, a Danish immigrant. The building he constructed is still standing today, a half mile south of the site of Inskip Station.

Climate
According to the Köppen Climate Classification system, Danner has a semi-arid climate, abbreviated "BSk" on climate maps.

See also
List of ghost towns in Oregon

References

External links
 Ghosttowns.com; Oregon; Innskip Station

Ghost towns in Oregon
Unincorporated communities in Malheur County, Oregon
Populated places established in 1863
Unincorporated communities in Oregon